Heredia is a genus of moths in the family Blastobasidae. It contains only one species, Heredia contemptionis, which is found in Costa Rica.

References

Monotypic moth genera
Blastobasidae genera
Moths of Central America